Tere Glassie (born 1 December 1977) is a former professional rugby league footballer who played as a  or  in the 1990s, 2000s and 2010s.

He played at representative level for the Cook Islands, and at club level for the South Sydney Rabbitohs, Balmain Tigers (non-first grade), Newtown Jets (three spells), Wests Magpies (non-first grade), Oldham R.L.F.C. (Heritage No. 1161), Leigh Centurions, Castleford Tigers (Heritage No. 865), Dewsbury Rams and Mounties (captain)

Playing career
Glassie learned his trade with South Sydney, playing 3 first grade games with the Rabbitohs before further lower grade stints with Balmain Tigers, Newtown Jets (two spells) and Wests Magpies. He then moved to the United Kingdom and played for Oldham, Leigh, Castleford Tigers and the Dewsbury Rams. He then returned to Australia and played for the Newtown Jets. Glassie then played in the 2017 Cook Islands grand final with the Avatiu Eels at age 39.

Representative career
Tere represented the Cook Islands in the 2000 World Cup.

In 2009 he was named as part of the Cook Islands squad for the Pacific Cup.

References

External links

Sports TG profile

1977 births
Living people
Balmain Ryde-Eastwood Tigers players
Castleford Tigers players
Cook Island expatriate rugby league players
Cook Island expatriates in Australia
Cook Island rugby league players
Cook Islands national rugby league team captains
Cook Islands national rugby league team players
New Zealand expatriate sportspeople in England
New Zealand expatriate sportspeople in Australia
Dewsbury Rams players
Expatriate rugby league players in Australia
Leigh Leopards players
Mount Pritchard Mounties captains
Mount Pritchard Mounties players
Newtown Jets NSW Cup players
Oldham R.L.F.C. players
Rugby articles needing expert attention
Rugby league locks
Rugby league props
Rugby league second-rows
South Sydney Rabbitohs players
Western Suburbs Magpies NSW Cup players